Barbara Hannah Anita Burke (13 May 1917 – 8 August 1998) was a British and South African sprint runner. She competed for Great Britain in the 1936 Summer Olympics, where she won a silver medal in the  relay and placed fourth in a semi-final of the individual 100 m event.

At the British Empire Games she competed for South Africa. In 1934 she was a member of the South African relay team which finished fourth in the 110-220-110 yards relay. In the individual 100 and 220 yard events she was eliminated in the heats. Four years later Burke won the 80 metres hurdles contest at the 1938 Games. In the 100 and 220 yard sprint events she finished fourth-fifth.

References

1917 births
1998 deaths
South African female sprinters
South African female hurdlers
British female sprinters
British female hurdlers
Olympic athletes of Great Britain
Athletes (track and field) at the 1936 Summer Olympics
Olympic silver medallists for Great Britain
Athletes (track and field) at the 1934 British Empire Games
Athletes (track and field) at the 1938 British Empire Games
Commonwealth Games gold medallists for South Africa
Commonwealth Games medallists in athletics
People from the London Borough of Croydon
Athletes from London
British emigrants to South Africa
Medalists at the 1936 Summer Olympics
Olympic silver medalists in athletics (track and field)
Medallists at the 1938 British Empire Games